Juana Rangel de Cuellar (6 October 1649 &dash; 1736) was the founder of the Colombian city of Cúcuta, located in the Norte de Santander Department. She was born and died in Pamplona. 

At the age of 23, she was orphaned of her father (1672), and her home was moved to Hacienda Tonchalá, (today Carmen de Tonchalá district) in the company of Paula, her mother, who died in 1694.

She was the owner of numerous assets, among which were the site of Tonchalá, which she obtained by inheritance from her uncle, the priest Alonso Rangel de Cuéllar; the Estancias El Rodeo, Cazadero, owned by her paternal hereditary good; Morantes, Cerro de Magro, the Guaduas site and the famous Guasimal site.

She was also the owner of numerous head of cattle and owned the Pamplona manor house, donated by her older brother.

The founder signed deeds of freedom of slaves; among them are granted on November 10, 1727, in favor of José, 21 years old; and for the benefit of the mulattos Teodora and José Prisio, and a last one, in 1733, in favor of Inés Rafaela.

Enterprising and dynamic, she did not lag behind her landowner neighbors; The economic boom based on agriculture and livestock, which lasted 40 years since her arrival in Tonchalá, was the main reason why different families chose this place as their preferred place for her home.

Tonchalá and Guasimal had everything, except the most important, Parroquia. On the contrary, on the other side of the Pamplonita River, was the Indian Town of Cúcuta, with a parish, a good church and a doctrinal priest.

But there, the whites could not access easily because the Indians of the Pueblo of Cúcuta did not allow it.

Due to the above and because the part occupied by the whites in her farm is not desmendro, to her patrimony, Juana Rangel de Cuéllar considered a legal and formal donation to the petitioners of the parish.

At the advanced age of 84 years, he went to the Mayor of Pamplona, so that together with the clerk they would arrive at his estate in Tonchalá to make before them, representatives of the crown, a donation of half a stay of larger cattle, which would be a seat to the parish and surrounding town.

The clerk was not present and in his absence, Mayor Juan Antonio de Villamizar y Pinero acted as him. This was the simple birth of the city without borders, on June 17, 1733.

Seven neighbors accepted the deed of donation, three witnesses and 17 people notified as neighbors for the donated lands. The value of the donated land was 50 patacones, the value stipulated in the document that Juana Rangel de Cuéllar signed as a public deed.

Two years later, June 24, 1735, she assisted as godmother of a baptized child in the chapel of the nascent town, and a couple of months later she granted testamentary memory.

Harassed by the ailments of her age, Juana Rangel de Cuéllar was taken back to Pamplona, where she died in 1736.

References
Cucutanuestra.com - Profile of Juana Rangel de Cuellar

1649 births
1736 deaths
Cúcuta
People from Cúcuta